Parthenia or the Maydenhead of the first musicke that ever was printed for the Virginalls was, as the title states, the first printed collection of music for keyboard in England. 'Virginals' was a generic word at the time that covered all plucked keyboard instruments – the harpsichord, muselaar and virginals, but most of the pieces are also suited for the clavichord and chamber organ. Though the date is uncertain, it was probably published around 1612. The 21 pieces included are ascribed to William Byrd, John Bull, and Orlando Gibbons, in three sections.

The title Parthenia comes from the Greek parthenos meaning "maiden" or "virgin." The music is written for the Virginals, the etymology of which is unknown, but may either refer to the young girls who are often shown playing it, or from the Latin virga, which means "stick" or "wand", possibly referring to part of the mechanism that plucks a string in the harpsichord family of instruments. The "Maydenhead" refers to the maiden voyage or, in this case, the first printing of Parthenia. The dedication to the first edition opens with the phrase: The virgin PARTHENIA (whilst yet I may) I offer up to your virgin Highnesses.

Music engraving
Parthenia was printed and sold by G.Lowe of Lothbury, a district of the City of London populated by coppersmiths since the Middle Ages.
The music was engraved on copper plates by William Hole. This was the first time that engraving was used for English music scores, although engraved music had been printed on the continent from the late 16th century.

The use of movable type had proved satisfactory for vocal music in particular. However, movable type does not work well with keyboard music. Engraving offers potentially better results. For reasons that are not clear, Parthenia did not take full advantage of the new technology. The music is difficult to sight-read as the notes are not positioned vertically in relation to their values. Perhaps this reflects inability to read music on the part of Hole or, as some commentators have suggested, the work was published as a record rather than for practical performance.

Date
The presumed first edition of Parthenia is undated.  However, its dedication suggests it was probably published around 1612.

To the high and mighty Frederick, Elector Palatine of the Reine: and his betrothed Lady, Elizabeth the only daughter of my Lord the king.

This couple was betrothed in December 1612 and married in February 1613. Frederick and Elizabeth subsequently left England, and a further printing in 1613 promptly changed the dedication to read: Dedicated to all the Maisters and Louers of Musick. The last printing was made in 1659.

Symbolism 
The dedication refers to the use of the notes "E" and "F" in the music of Parthenia. In this context, "E" refers to Elizabeth Stuart, "F" to Frederick V. The dedication has the phrase

The linking of the two letters/notes is evident in the Orlando Gibbons movement The Queenes Command in which he begins the piece with the notes E and F and uses these notes to start future measures or to tie measures together.

Contents
Many of the pieces are dances, the pavane and galliard.

List of pieces

William Byrd
(BK numbers refer to Musica Britannica: William Byrd Keyboard Music, ed. Alan Brown (London: Stainer & Bell, 2 vols, 1969/71)) 
1. Preludium, BK1 
2. Pavana Sir William Petre, BK3a 
3. Galiardo Sir William Petre, BK3b 
4. Preludium, BK24 
5. Galiardo Mris Marye Brownlo, BK34 
6. Pavana Earle of Salisbury, BK15a 
7. Galiardo Earle of Salisbury, BK15b 
8. Galiardo Secundo Earle of Salisbury, BK15c

John Bull
9. Preludium 
10. Pavana St. Thomas Wake 
11. Galiardo St. Thomas Wake 
12. Pavana 
13. Galiardo 
14. Galiardo 
15. Galiardo

Orlando Gibbons 
16. Galiardo 
17. Fantazia of Foure Parts 
18. The Lord Salisbury his Pavin 
19. Galiardo 
20. The Queenes Command 
21. Preludium

Sequel
A companion work Parthenia inviolata, or Mayden-Musicke for the Virginalls and Bass-Viol was published soon afterwards. The title contains a play on words involving the word viol. This sequel is said to have been compiled by one Robert Hole.

See also

 The Mulliner Book
 The Dublin Virginal Manuscript
 My Ladye Nevells Booke
 Susanne van Soldt Manuscript
 Clement Matchett's Virginal Book
 Fitzwilliam Virginal Book
 Priscilla Bunbury's Virginal Book
 Elizabeth Rogers' Virginal Book
 Anne Cromwell's Virginal Book

References 

 Parthenia, The Harrow Replicas, Chiswick Press, London 1942
 Parthenia, edited by Kurt Stone, Broude Brothers, New York 1951
 A Reevaluation of Parthenia and its Contents, Janet Pollack, Duke University, 2001 
 Manuscript Additions in Parthenia and other Early English Printed Music in America, David Greer. Music and Letters, 77 (1996), 169–82
 The Keyboard Music of John Bull, Walker Cunningham, UMI Research Press, Ann Arbor, 1984
 The Consort and Keyboard Music of William Byrd, Oliver Neighbour, University of California Press, Berkeley, 1978
 Orlando Gibbons and the Gibbons Family of Musicians, John Harley, Ashgate Publishing Company, Vermont, 1999

External links 
 
 Parthenia, RVRCD.com

Music anthologies
Music books
English music
Compositions for harpsichord
Compositions for keyboard
1611 works